Air Commodore Roy Kenneth Orrock DFC (18 January 1921 – 11 July 2002) was a British pilot during the Second World War and a senior Royal Air Force officer in the post-war years. He served as the fourteenth Commandant Royal Observer Corps from 1973 to 1975. He was Aide-de-camp to Queen Elizabeth II.

During the Second World War, Orrock flew with No. 22 Squadron RAF flying the Bristol Beaufighter moving to the Mediterranean in 1942 after which the unit was posted to North Africa and then the far east and later as Commanding officer of No. 248 Squadron RAF flying the de Havilland Mosquito. On 17 March 1945 whilst leading a strike force over Ålesund, Norway, Orrock's aircraft was hit by flak but made a successfully ditching but became a POW until the end of the war.

References

External links
Banff Wing Strikes – Wing Commander R K Orrock
RAF Valley station commander – Gp Captain R K Orrock

|-

|-

1921 births
2002 deaths
Military personnel from Essex
Royal Air Force personnel of World War II
English aviators
People of the Royal Observer Corps
Recipients of the Distinguished Flying Cross (United Kingdom)
Royal Air Force officers